The 1926 Birthday Honours were appointments by King George V to various orders and honours to reward and highlight good works by citizens of the British Empire. The appointments were made to celebrate the official birthday of The King on 3 June, but it was announced on 20 May that due to the national strike, the King had approved the Prime Minister's recommendation to delay the publication of the list until 3 July 1926. The honours were effective to 5 June 1926. Per standard practice, Sir Paul Chater, who died 27 May 1926, still received the honour of Knight Commander of the Order of the British Empire as he would have received the honour if he had survived.

The recipients of honours are displayed here as they were styled before their new honour, and arranged by honour, with classes (Knight, Knight Grand Cross, etc.) and then divisions (Military, Civil, etc.) as appropriate.

United Kingdom and British Empire

Viscount
Captain Courtenay Charles Evan, Baron Tredegar  For public and political services.

Baron
Henry Seymour Berry  by the name, title and style of Baron Buckland, of Bwlch in the County of Brecon. For public, political and philanthropic services.

Privy Councillor
The King appointed the following to His Majesty's Most Honourable Privy Council:
Colonel John Gretton  Member of Parliament for South Derbyshire.1895-1906; for Rutland, 1907-1918; for Burton since December 1918. For political and public services.
Sir Halford John Mackinder, Chairman of the Imperial Shipping and Imperial Economic Committees. First Principal of University College, Reading, now the University of Reading
Richard William Alan, Earl of Onslow  Under Secretary for War. For public services.

Baronetcies
Sir Arthur Shirley Benn  Member of Parliament for Plymouth, Drake Division, since December 1910. President, Association of British Chambers of Commerce 1921-22 and 1922-23. For political and public services.
Colonel Henry Ferryman Bowles  Chairman or President, Enfield Conservative Association 1885-1926; Member of Parliament for the Enfield Division, 1889-1906 and 1918-22. For public and political services.
Brigadier General Robert Gordon Gordon-Gilmour  of Liberton and Craigmillar. President of the Scottish Unionist Association. Convener of the Eastern Divisional Council of the Scottish Unionist Association. For political and public services.
James Augustus Grant  Member of Parliament, Egremont Division 1910-18; Whitehaven Division 1918-22; Derby South since October 1924. For political and public services.
Colonel John Wakefield Weston  Member of Parliament for South Westmorland, 1913–18, and Westmorland, 1918-24. Chairman of County Council from 1908 till present time. For political and public services.
Lieutenant-Colonel Godfrey Dalrymple White  Member of Parliament for Southport 1910-23 and since 1924. For political and public services.

Knight Bachelor
Edward Tindal Atkinson  Railway and Canal Commissioner since 1919
Herbert Baker  In recognition of his services to art
Alderman John Bickerstaffe  Was Chairman and Leader of the Conservative Party in Blackpool for over 20 years. Member of the Borough Council for 46 years. For political and public services.
Major Archibald Boyd Boyd-Carpenter  Member of Parliament for North Bradford 1918-23 and for Coventry since 1924. Parliamentary Secretary, Ministry of Labour 1922-23; Financial Secretary to the Treasury and Paymaster General 1923 Parliamentary and Financial Secretary, Admiralty, July 1923 till January 1924. For political and public services.
Alexander Keith Carlyon  President, Harrow Conservative Association, 1919-25. Chairman of the Hendon Bench. For political and public services. 
Brigadier General George Kynaston Cockerill  Member of Parliament for the Reigate Division since 1918. For political and public services.
Henry Coward  Conductor of the Sheffield Musical Union
James Inglis Davidson, Director of the Scottish Chamber of Agriculture. For public services.
Edwin Dodd, In recognition of his long services to the Shaftesbury Society and Ragged School Union
William Edward Dudley  For public services. Director of the Co-operative Wholesale Society of Manchester. President of the Co-operative Congress 1925-6
Alfred Henry Evans  Member of the Unionist Association of the Tamworth Division since 1895 and President and Chairman since 1920. For political and public services.
Lieutenant Colonel Charles Henry Brabazon Heaton-Ellis  Chairman of the Hitchin Division Conservative Association for about 20 years. Member of Herts County Council 1903-19. For political and public services.
Captain Houston French  Lieutenant, Yeomen of the Guard
George Rowland Hill, for over 37 years Chairman of the Greenwich Conservative Association. London County Council (LCC) Member for Greenwich 1922-25. For political and public services.
Francis Eden Lacey, Secretary to Marylebone Cricket Club since 1898
Colonel Henry George Lyons  Director and Secretary of the Science Museum
Stanley Machin  President of the Association of British Chambers of Commerce. For public services.
Lawrence Margerison  Secretary to the National Savings Committee
Lieutenant-Colonel Francis Kennedy McClean. In recognition of his services to aviation
Christopher George Musgrave  Chairman of the Metropolitan Water Board. For public services.
William Haldane Porter  Chief Inspector, Aliens Branch, Home Office
Lieutenant-Colonel Assheton Pownall  Member of Parliament for East Lewisham since 1918. For political and public services.
Ernest Victor Buckley Rutherford  For public services.
George Shedden  President, Isle of Wight Conservative and Unionist Association since 1922. For political and public services.
Andrew Thomas Taylor  Mayor of Hampstead 1922-23. LCC Member for Hampstead since 1908. Vice-Chairman of the LCC 1919-20. For public and political services.

British India
Lallubhai Shamaldas Mehta  lately temporary Member of the Executive Council, Bombay
Justice Philip Lindsay Buckland, Puisne Judge, High Court of Judicature, Calcutta
Justice Cecil Walsh  Puisne Judge, High Court of Judicature, Allahabad
Ganendro Prosad Roy, Director-General of Posts and Telegraphs
Colonel Gordon Risley Hearn  Agent, Eastern Bengal Railway
Robert McLean, Agent, Great Indian Peninsula Railway
Lieutenant-Colonel Bradford Leslie  Royal Engineers, Chairman, Madras Port Trust
Phiroze Cursetjee Sethna  Manager, Sun Life Assurance Company A Canada, Bombay
Raj Bahadur Purohit Gopi Nath  Member of the Jaipur Council of State
Brajendranath Seal  Vice-Chancellor of Mysore University
Walter Stuart James Willson, Member of the Legislative Assembly
Khan Bahadur Ebrahim Haroon Jaffer, Member of the Council of State
John Walter Hose  Indian Civil Service (retired), attached Public and Judicial Department, India Office

Dominions
George Mason Allard, Representative of the Government of the Commonwealth of Australia on, and Chairman of, the Amalgamated Wireless Company Ltd., in recognition also of his services to the Commonwealth Government in connection with banking and financial matters.
George Fairbairn, Agent-General in London for the State of Victoria
Frank Fox  Secretary of the Fellowship of the British Empire Exhibition; in recognition of his services to the Empire
Charles Holdsworth, Managing Director Of the Union Steamship Company of New Zealand Ltd., recognition of his services in the development of New Zealand
The Hon. Charles Ernest Statham, Speaker of the House of Representatives, Dominion of New Zealand

Colonies, Protectorates, etc.
Fiennes Cecil Arthur Barrett-Lennard, Chief Justice of the Supreme Court of Jamaica
Henry Hessey Johnston Gompertz, Chief Justice, Federated Malay States
Edward Allan Grannum  Colonial Secretary, Mauritius
William Henry Himbury, General Manager, British Cotton Growing Association
William Morrison, Member of the Privy Council of, and Nominated Member of the Legislative Council of Jamaica; in recognition of his public services.

The Most Honourable Order of the Bath

Knight Grand Cross of the Order of the Bath (GCB)

Military Division
Army
General Sir Claud William Jacob  Indian Army, Military Secretary, India Office, late General Officer Commanding-in-Chief, Northern Command, India

Civil Division
The Rt. Hon. Sir Herbert Louis Samuel  For public services.

Knight Commander of the Order of the Bath (KCB)

Military Division
Royal Navy
Vice-Admiral Sir Rudolf Walter Bentinck 
Vice-Admiral Herbert William Richmond 

Army
Lieutenant-General Sir John Sharman Fowler  Colonel Commandant, Royal Corps of Signals
Major-General Henry Leycester Croker 
Major-General Pomeroy Holland-Pryor  Indian Army, Deputy Adjutant and Quartermaster-General, Southern Command, India
Major-General Harrington Owen Parr  Indian Army, late Military Secretary, Army Headquarters, India

Civil Division
William John Berry  Director of Naval Construction, Admiralty
William Montagu Graham-Harrison  Secondary Parliamentary Counsel

Companion of the Order of the Bath (CB)

Military Division
Royal Navy
Engineer Rear Admiral George William Baldwin 
Captain Thomas Erskine Wardle 
Captain Alister Francis Beal 
Surgeon Captain Reginald St. George Smallridge Bond 
Lieutenant-Colonel George Leonard Raikes  Royal Marines

Army
Major-General Robert Strickland Hannay  Deputy Director of Medical Services, Southern Command
Major-General Charles Bonham-Carter  General Staff, Eastern-Command
Colonel Henry Richardson Peck  Commanding Royal Artillery, 2nd Division, Aldershot
Colonel Cuthbert Graham Fuller  Brigade Commander, Canal Brigade, Egypt
Colonel George Hanbury Noble Jackson  Brigade Commander, 7th Infantry Brigade
Colonel Frank Walter Wilson  Assistant Director of Veterinary Services, Eastern Command
Major-General Ernest Frederick Orton, Indian Army, Officiating Deputy Adjutant and Quartermaster-General, Southern Command, India
Colonel Dennis Deane  Indian Army, Commander, Ambala Brigade Area, India
Colonel Frederick Stewart Keen  Indian Army, Commandant, Small Arms School, India

Royal Air Force
Air Commodore Thomas Charles Reginald Higgins

Civil Division

Rear-Admiral John Ernest Troyte Harper 
Frank Edward Smith  Director of Scientific Research, Admiralty
Colonel Richard Edgar Sugden  Territorial Army, Brigade Commander, 147th (2nd West Riding) Infantry Brigade, Territorial Army
George Clarke Simpson  Director of the Meteorological Office
John Wentworth Garneys Bond, Head of the Journal Office in the House of Commons
William Cecil Bottomley  Assistant Secretary, Colonial Office
William Richard Codling  Controller, H.M. Stationery Office
Bernard Montagu Draper, Director of Finance, War Office
Rupert Beswicke Howorth, Assistant Secretary, Cabinet Office
John Stewart Stewart-Wallace, Chief Land Registrar, H.M. Land Registry

The Most Exalted Order of the Star of India

Knight Commander (KCSI)
Sir Alexander Phillips Muddiman  Indian Civil Service, Member of the Governor-General's Executive Council

Companion (CSI)
Arthur William Botham  Indian Civil Service, Member of the Executive Council, Assam
George Gall Sim  Indian Civil Service, Financial Commissioner of Railways
Leonard Birley  Indian Civil Service, Chief Secretary to the Government of Bengal
Neil Macmichael, Indian Civil Service, Member, Board of Revenue, Madras

The Most Distinguished Order of Saint Michael and Saint George

Knight Commander of the Order of St Michael and St George (KCMG)

Colonel Sir Alexander MacCormick  a leading Surgeon in Australia; in recognition of his services to the Commonwealth of Australia
Sir Donald Charles Cameron  Governor and Commander-in-Chief, Tanganyika Territory
Brigadier-General Sir Gilbert Falkingham Clayton  For services rendered in concluding agreements with the Sultan of Nejd and for the conduct of a mission to the Imam of the Yemen
Charles Strachey  Assistant Undersecretary of State, Colonial Office
His Excellency the Rt. Hon. Sir Ronald William Graham  His Majesty's Ambassador Extraordinary and Plenipotentiary at Rome
His Excellency the Rt. Hon. Sir Ronald Charles Lindsay  His Majesty's Ambassador Extraordinary and Plenipotentiary in Turkey
Sir Charles Murray Marling  His Majesty's Envoy Extraordinary and Minister Plenipotentiary at the Hague
The Hon. Francis Oswald Lindley  His Majesty's Envoy Extraordinary and Minister Plenipotentiary at Oslo
The Hon. Sir Odo William Theophilus Villiers Russell  His Majesty's Envoy Extraordinary and Minister Plenipotentiary to the Holy See
Victor Alexander Augustus Henry Wellesley  Deputy Under-Secretary of State, Foreign Office

Honorary Knight Commander
Abdul Mushin Beg Al-Sa'dun, Prime Minister of Iraq

Companion of the Order of St Michael and St George (CMG)

Lawrence Arthur Adamson Headmaster of Wesley College, Melbourne, Member of the Council of Melbourne University; in recognition of his services to Education in the State of Victoria
The Reverend Ronald George MacIntyre  Professor of Systematic Theology, St. Andrew's College, Sydney University; in recognition of his services to the Commonwealth of Australia
John Sutherland Ross, of the City of Dunedin, Chairman of Directors of the New Zealand and South Seas Exhibition, Dominion of New Zealand
Harold Livingstone Tapley, Member of the House of Representatives, Dominion of New Zealand, Mayor of the City of Dunedin, and a Director of the New Zealand and South Seas Exhibition
Edgar Wrigley Cozens-Hardy, General Manager of the Government Railways, Gold Coast 
Herbert Layard Dowbiggin, Inspector-General of Police, Ceylon
Arthur William Hill  Director, Royal Botanic Gardens, Kew
Richard Nosworthy, Collector-General, Jamaica
Major Henry Cecil Prescott  Inspector-General of Police, Iraq
John Owen Shircore  Director of Medical and Sanitary Services, Tanganyika Territory
Richard Olaf Winstedt  Director of Education, Straits Settlements and Federated Malay States
The Hon. Alexander George Montagu Cadogan, a First Secretary in the Foreign Office
Reginald Hervey Hoare, Counsellor of Embassy in His Majesty's Diplomatic Service, Constantinople
Harold Porter, Acting British Consul-General at Hankow
Oswald Longstaff Prowde, Resident Engineer, Sennar Dam

The Most Eminent Order of the Indian Empire

Knight Commander (KCIE)

Raja Panaganti Ramarayaningar, Raja of Panagal, Minister for Local Self-Government, Madras
John Perronet Thompson  Indian Civil Service, Political Secretary to the Government of India, Foreign and Political Department
Sir Geoffrey Fitzhervey de Montmorency  Indian Civil Service, Private Secretary to His Excellency the Viceroy

Companion (CIE)

Edward Herbert Kealy, Indian Civil Service, Resident, Baroda
M. R. Ry. Tiruvalangadu Raja Sastri Venkatarama Sastriyar Avargal, Advocate-General, Madras
Miles Irving  Indian Civil Service, Financial Secretary to Government, Punjab
Harry Oliver Baron Shoubridge, Chief Engineer, Public Works Department, Bombay
Colonel Krishnaji Vishnoo Kukday, Indian Medical Service, Inspector-General of Civil Hospitals, Central Provinces
Samuel Walter Goode, Indian Civil Service, Officiating Chairman of the Calcutta Improvement Trust
Arthur Harold Walter Bentinck, Indian Civil Service, Deputy Commissioner of Sylhet, Assam
Harry Llewellyn Lyons Allanson, Indian Civil Service, District and Sessions Judge, Bihar and Orissa
Khan Bahadur Pirzada Muhammad Hosain, late District and Sessions Judge, Delhi
William Henry Albert Webster, Commissioner of Police, Kangoon
Raj Bahadur Hementa Kumar Raha, Deputy Director-General of Post Offices, India
John Collard Bernard Drake  Indian Civil Service, Secretary to the High Commissioner for India
Lieutenant-Colonel Thomas William Harley, Indian Medical Service, District Medical and Sanitary Officer and Superintendent, Medical School, Madura, Madras
George Clark, Director of Agriculture, United Provinces
Major Donald George Sandeman, Indian Army, North-West Frontier Intelligence Bureau
Hormasji Jehangir Bhabha, late Inspector-General of Education, Mysore State
Sardar Mir Masud Alum Khan, Nawab of Belha, Bombay
Khwaja Nazim-ud-Din, Member of the Bengal Legislative Council, Chairman of Dacca Municipality
Alfred Cooper Woollier, Dean of University Instruction, Lahore
Alfred Lawrence Covernton, Principal and Professor of English Literature, Elphinstone College, Bombay
Percy Saville Burrell, Professor of Philosophy, Allahabad University
Girja Shankar Bajpai  Indian Civil Service, Secretary of recent Deputation from the Government of India to South Africa

The Royal Victorian Order

Knight Grand Cross of the Royal Victorian Order (GCVO)

Admiral The Hon. Sir Edmund Robert Fremantle  (dated 31 May 1926)
Major-General Sir John Hanbury-Williams

Knight Commander of the Royal Victorian Order (KCVO)

The Hon. John William Fortescue  (dated 16 June 1926)
Victor George Seymour Corkran 
John Murray 
Herbert Edward Mitchell

Commander of the Royal Victorian Order (CVO)

Major The Hon. Arthur Hay 
Brigadier-General Gerald Frederic Trotter 
William John Hocking 
Lieutenant-Colonel Granville Cecil Douglas-Gordon 
The Reverend Canon Arthur Rowland Harry Grant 
Noel Curtis-Bennett
Ernest Clarke  
John Berkeley Monck
John Weir

Member of the Royal Victorian Order, 4th class (MVO)
Edwin Charles Cox 
Major Frank Melvin Matthews 
Robert Burns Robertson  (Fifth Class)
Thomas Francis Vaughan Prickard

Member of the Royal Victorian Order, 5th class (MVO)

George Herbert Smith

The Most Excellent Order of the British Empire

Dame Grand Cross of the Order of the British Empire (GBE)

Christina Allen Massey  for services to the Dominion of New Zealand

Knight Grand Cross of the Order of the British Empire (GBE)

Military Division
Royal Navy
Admiral Sir Frederic Edward Errington Brock  (Retired)

Civil Division

The Rt. Hon. John Poynder, Baron Islington  Retiring Chairman of the National Savings Committee
Sir William Warrender Mackenzie  late President of the Industrial Court
Almeric Hugh, Baron Queenborough. For public services.

Dame Commander of the Order of the British Empire (DBE)

Madge Kendal-Grimston. For services to the drama.
Agnes Gwendoline Hunt  Founder and supporter of the Shropshire Orthopaedic Hospital
The Hon. Maude Agnes Lawrence, Director of Women Establishments, H.M. Treasury
Jessie Percy Butler Wilton Phipps  For services to Education
Mary Ann Dacomb Scharlieb  Consulting Gynaecologist, Royal Free Hospital

Knight Commander of the Order of the British Empire (KBE)

Military Division
Royal Navy
Vice-Admiral Edward Buxton Kiddle  (Retired)

Army
Major General Cyril John Deverell  British Service, late General Officer Commanding, United Provinces District, India

Royal Air Force
Air Vice-Marshal John Miles Steel

Civil Division

Walter MacArthur Allen  Commandant-in-Chief, Metropolitan Special Constabulary
Max Julius Bonn  Chairman of the London Advisory Committee for Juvenile Employment. For public services.
Sir Frank Watson Dyson  Astronomer Royal
Ernest Arthur Gowers  Permanent Under Secretary for Mines
Charles Hipwood  Principal Assistant Secretary, Board of Trade
Mark Webster Jenkinson  For services to the War Office in connection with Army Accounting
Captain Arthur Henry Rostron  Captain of the 
Professor William Somerville  late-Sibthorpian Professor of Rural Economy, University of Oxford. For services to Agricultural Education and Research
Sir Percy Woodhouse  Chairman, Manchester Conservative and Unionist Association. For political and public services.
Alexander Kemp Wright  Vice-Chairman, Scottish National Savings Committee

British India
Nasarvanji Navroji Wadia  Mill-owner, Bombay
George Frederick Paddison  Indian Civil Service, Chairman of recent Deputation from the Government of India to South Africa

Diplomatic Service and Overseas List
Sidney Barton  His Majesty's Consul-General at Shanghai
Reginald Stewart Patterson  Financial Adviser to the Egyptian Government

Dominions
The Honourable John Robert Bennett, Colonial Secretary, Newfoundland
The Hon. Francis Grenville Clarke  President of the Legislative Council, State of Victoria
James Oswald Fairfax  of the City of Sydney, Chairman of the Australian Section of the Empire Press Union; in recognition of his services to the Commonwealth of Australia

Colonies, Protectorates, etc.

Captain Cecil Hamilton Armitage  Governor and Commander-in-Chief of the Colony of the Gambia
Thomas Alexander Vans Best  Lieutenant-Governor of the Island of Malta, lately Colonial Secretary, Colony of Trinidad and Tobago
Sir Catchick Paul Chater  In recognition of his public services in the Colony of Hong Kong (posthumous)

Honorary Knight Commander
Elly Silas Kadoorie, in recognition of his services in the cause of charity and education in Iraq and Palestine

Commander of the Order of the British Empire (CBE)

Military Division
Royal Navy
Head Sister Margaret Helen Keenan  Queen Alexandra's Royal Naval Nursing Service
Paymaster-Captain Frederick George Motton  
Captain Charles Mahon Readhead 
Captain George-Francis Hyde 

Army
Colonel Jacob Waley-Cohen  Territorial Army
Major and Brevet Lieutenant-Colonel Richard Conway Dobbs  The Royal Irish Fusiliers (Princess Victoria's) and Lieutenant-Colonel Commanding 1st (Nyasaland) Battalion, The King's African Rifles
Colonel John Frederic Charles Fuller  Military Assistant (General Staff Officer), Department of the Chief of the Imperial General Staff, War Office
Chief Lady Superintendent Marion Domville Knapp  Queen Alexandra's Military Nursing Service for India
Lieutenant-Colonel Charles Richard Henry Palmer Landon  Commandant 10/20th Burma Rifles, Indian Army
Lieutenant-Colonel Alexander Charles Broughton Mackinnon, 2/2nd King Edward's Own Gurkha Rifles (The Sirmoor Rifles), Indian Army
Colonel George Colleymore Sturrock, Director of Ordnance Factories and Manufacture Master General of Supply Branch, Army Headquarters, India
Colonel Walter King Venning  Assistant Adjutant General, War Office
The Reverend Francis Joseph Walker  Royal Army Chaplains' Department, Assistant Chaplain General, Eastern Command
Colonel Richard Stephen Murray-White  Brigade Commander, 156th (West Scottish) Infantry Brigade, Territorial
Colonel Maurice Lean Wilkinson, Commandant Artillery College

Royal Air Force
Wing Commander Frank Howard Kirby

Civil Division

Albert Abbott, Chief Inspector of Technical and Continuation Schools, Board of Education
James Barrie, Chairman of the Glasgow Savings Committee
John Joseph Bickersteth  late Clerk of the Peace and Clerk of the County Council, East Riding of Yorkshire
Christopher Llewellyn Bullock  Principal Private Secretary to the Secretary of State for Air
Hamilton Conacher, Permanent Secretary, Ministry of Labour, Northern Ireland
James Vincent Coyle, Assistant Secretary, Ministry of Agriculture, Northern Ireland
Colonel Edward William Crawford  late Colonel, Corps of Military Accountants
Ernest Tristram Crutchley  Acting Finance Officer, Oversea Settlement Department of the Dominions Office
Arthur Edwin Cutforth, Member of the firm of Deloitte, Plender, Griffiths & Co., Chartered Accountants. For public services.
George Selby Washington Epps, Principal Actuary, Government Actuary's Department
Lilian Mary Faithfull  Principal of Cheltenham Ladies College, 1907-1922
William John Gibson, Rector of the Nicolson Institute, Stornoway, Isle of Lewis
Edythe Mary Glanville  The first woman to be elected Vice-Chairman of the Metropolitan Division of the National Union of Conservative and Unionist Associations. In 1920 elected to the N.U.A Executive and re-elected annually. For political and public services.
Haywood Temple Holmes  Accountant, H.M. Treasury
William George Hunter, Deputy Accountant-General, Ministry of Health
Captain Fullarton James  Chief Constable of Northumberland
George Henry Kingston  Assistant Director of Army Contracts
John Lindsay Mackie, Assistant Secretary, Board of Customs and Excise
William Owen Owen, Divisional Controller, Wales, Ministry of Labour
Philip Palmer  Manager, Constructive Department, Chatham Dockyard
James Martin Ritchie, Chairman of the Bridge ton Local Employment Committee
Sir George Royle  For voluntary services in connection with the National Savings Committee
Benjamin James Saunders  Chairman of Brighton, Horsham and District War Pensions Committee
Andrew Donnan Smith, Chief Constable of Glasgow
William Alexander Valentine, Controller, London Telephone Service
Hilda Frances Zigomala. For services in connection with Lord Roberts Workshops

British India
Sir Deva Prasad Sarvadhikary  Member of recent Deputation from the Government of India to South Africa
Saiyid Raza Ah, Member oi the Council of State Member of recent Deputation from the Government of India to South Africa
Harry Tonkinson  Indian Civil Service, Joint Secretary to the Government of India, Home Department
Lieutenant-Colonel Edmond Henry Salt James  Revenue and Judicial Commissioner, Baluchistan
Lieutenant-Colonel Wingate Wemyss Muir  Indian Army, Comptroller, Viceregal Household
Captain Victor Felix Gamble  lately Private Secretary to His Excellency the Governor of Burma
Victor Bayley  Superintendent of Works, Khyber Railway
Henry Joseph Trivess Smith, Engineer, Tansa Completion Works, Bombay Municipality

Diplomatic Service and Overseas List
Henry Montesquieu Anthony, Director-General of the State Domains Administration, Egyptian Government
Robert Allason Furnes, late Oriental Secretary at Cairo
Edgar George Jamieson, Acting British Consul at Shanghai
Claude Cecil Augustus Kirke, His Majesty's Consul at Swatow
Francis Alfred Oliver, His Majesty's Consul-General at Hamburg

Dominions
Gertrude Drayton  Secretary of the Victoria League
Charles Samuel Nathan, of the City of Perth, Western Australia, in recognition of his services to the Commonwealth of Australia
Colonel Percy Thomas Owen  Director-General of Works, Commonwealth of Australia, Chief Engineer under the-Federal Capital Commission
The Hon. John Warburton Pennington, Member of the Legislative Assembly, State of Victoria, formerly Member of the Ministry of that State
Samuel Hurst Seager  a prominent Architect in the Dominion of New Zealand
Charles Speight, Vice-Chairman of the New Zealand and South Seas Exhibition, Dominion of New Zealand
William Charles Frederick Thomas, President of the Flour Millers Association, Victoria, Chairman of the Commonwealth Dried Fruits Control Board; in recognition, of his services to the Commonwealth of Australia
Sir Philip Bourchier Sherard Wrey  Chief Commissioner for Southern Rhodesia at the British Empire Exhibition 1924-25

Colonies, Protectorates, etc.
Captain James Davidson, lately Senior Resident, Southern Provinces, Nigeria
Charles Cuthbert Harward  Divisional Irrigation Engineer, Ceylon
Colonel George Wykeham Heron  Royal Army Medical Corps, (Retired), Director of the Department of Health, Palestine
Captain (local Lieutenant-Colonel) Frederick Gerald Peake  Officer Commanding the Arab Legion, Trans-Jordan
John Henry Matthews Robson, Unofficial Member of the Federal Council, Federated Malay States
Frédéric Melchior Louis Rouillard  Unofficial Member of the Council of Government, Mauritius
Stanley Rivers-Smith  Director of Education, Tanganyika Territory
Lionel Maynard Swan, Chief Secretary to the Ministry of Finance, Iraq
Henry Barclay Walcott  Treasurer, Colony of Trinidad and Tobago; represented to the Colony at the Trade Conference at Ottawa, 1925
The Reverend Arthur West Wilkie, Head of the Scottish Mission, Gold Coast; in recognition of his services to education

Honorary Commanders
Dato Abdullah bin Jaafar, the Dato Mentri Besar of Johore, Malay States
Dato Klana Petra, Mamor, Undang of Sungei Ujong, Negri Sembilan, Federated Malay States

Officer of the Order of the British Empire (OBE)

Military Division
Royal Navy
Commander Guy Onslow Lydekker 
Lieutenant-Commander Napier Robert Peploe 
Engineer-Commander Edgar William Riley 
Major Arthur Charles Barnby 
Commander Norman Ffolliott Wells 

Army
Captain and Brevet Major Philip Alexander Arden, Royal Army Service Corps, Adjutant, Royal Army Service Corps Training College, Aldershot
Major Walter Richard Barker, The Duke of Cornwall's Light Infantry (attached Sudan Defence Force)
Captain Alan Bruce Blaxland, 1/7th Rajput Regiment, Indian Army
Temp. Captain William Bligh  Royal Army Medical Corps
Lieutenant-Colonel The Hon. Stuart Pleydell-Bouverie  52nd (London) Anti-Aircraft Brigade, Royal Artillery, Territorial Army
Lieutenant-Colonel Henry Robert Brown, Indian Medical Service
Major William Egan  Royal Army Medical Corps (Deputy Assistant Director of Medical Services, Scottish Command)
Captain Rowland Eustace, 1/18th Royal Garhwal Bines, Indian Army
Captain Richard James Rolleston Freeth  Royal Artillery, attached Iraq Levies
Lieutenant Francis Gordon Griffith  North Western Railway Regiment, Auxiliary Force, India
Lieutenant-Colonel Frederic Snowden Hammond  11th London Regiment (Finsbury Rifles), Territorial Army
Major Archibald Gordon Rainsford-Hannay  Royal Engineers
Major Charles Henry Hasler Harold  Royal Army Medical Corps, Assistant Instructor, graded as Deputy Assistant Director of Hygiene, Aldershot
Quartermaster and Lieutenant-Colonel Thomas Arthur Heath  Deputy Assistant Director of Remounts, War Office
Lieutenant-Colonel Edward Lancelot Wall Henslow  Commandant, Army School of Physical Training, Aldershot
The Reverend Walter Bertram Hughes  Royal Army Chaplains' Department
Lieutenant-Colonel William David Kenny, Regular Army Reserve of Officers, The Royal Inniskilling Fusiliers, attached Sudan Defence Force
Major Charles James Seward le Cornu  13th Frontier Force Rifles, Indian Army (Commandant, Army Signal School, Poona)
Captain Arthur John Rupert Marshall Leslie, Royal Artillery, late Commandant, Malay States Volunteer Regiment
Major John Jestyn Llewellin  Dorsetshire Heavy Brigade, Royal Artillery, Territorial Army
Lieutenant-Colonel John Pemberton Heywood Heywood-Lonsdale  The Shropshire Yeomanry, Territorial Army
Major William Cecil Lowe  Royal Army Veterinary Corps
Captain Hubert Francis Lucas, Royal Engineers
Lieutenant William Gunn Mackay  Royal Artillery, lately serving with the local rank of Major in the Somaliland Camel Corps, The King's Africa n Rifles
Captain John Wright Malcolm  Royal Army Medical Corps, attached Iraq Levies
Major Bernard Culmer Page  Territorial Army, attached Royal Engineers, London District
Major George Frederick Joseph Paterson  Indian Army
Quartermaster and Major Walter Thomas Price  Extra Regimentally Employed List
Major Edward Johnson Ross  1/8th Gurkha Rifles, Indian Army
Captain Matthew Sheppard  Yorkshire Dragoons (Queen's Own) Yeomanry, Territorial Army
Lieutenant-Colonel William Simpkins  44th (Home Counties) Divisional Train, Royal Army Service Corps, Territorial Army
Major and Brevet Lieutenant-Colonel Charles Edward Steel, Royal Army Veterinary Corps, lately Deputy Assistant Director of Veterinary Services, Northern Command, India
Lieutenant-Colonel Robert Joseph Tucker Stewart, Supernumerary List, Indian Army
Captain and Brevet Major Ernest John Bocart Tagg  The Durham Light Infantry, Deputy Assistant Quartermaster General, The British Army of the Rhine
Major John Brereton Owst Trimble  The East Yorkshire Regiment, lately Commandant, Machine Gun School, India
Lieutenant-Colonel Edward Price Warlters  54th (City of London) Anti-Aircraft Brigade, Royal Artillery, Territorial Army

Royal Air Force
Flight Lieutenant Albert Wombwell

Civil Division

James Henry Avison, Chief Accountant, Board of Customs and Excise
William Archibald Basham, Principal, Ministry of Labour
George Albert Baxandall, Divisional Inspector of Technical and Continuation Schools, Board of Education Cadet
Lieutenant-Colonel Lancelot William Bennett  Late Commanding Officer 1st Cadet Battalion, London Regiment (The Queen's). For valuable services to the Cadet Force. 
Jabez Berry, Retired Principal, Board of Inland Revenue
Robert Thomson Birnie, Chief Constable of Forfarshire
Felix John Blakemore, Chairman of Wolverhampton and District War Pensions Committee
Harold Boughey, Deputy Divisional Controller, Midlands Division, Ministry of Labour
Beatrice Rachael Stirling Boyd, Founder and Honorary Secretary, Edinburgh Children's Holiday Fund
George Bryan, Senior Inspector of Audits, Ministry of Home Affairs, Northern Ireland
Frederick Vango Burridge  Principal, LCC Central School of Arts and Crafts
James Christie, Chief Constable of Greenock
James Temple Cotton  Principal, Air Ministry
John Philip Cross, Collector, Board of Customs and Excise
Captain Rupert John Goodman Crouch, Head of Airworthiness Section, Royal Aircraft Establishment, Air Ministry
Beatrice Mary Cumington, Woman Staff Inspector of Technical and Continuation Schools, Board of Education
Edith Ellen Drysdale, Private Secretary to Commissioner of Metropolitan Police
Alfred William Edwards, Deputy Controller, Central Telegraph Office
Florence Dorothy Garner, Chief Superintendent of Women's Staff, Public Trustee Office
James Simpson Godden, Principal Officer, Ministry of Labour, Northern Ireland
Frances Ralph Gray  High Mistress of St. Paul's Girls School
Walter John Haines, Superintending Inspector, Board of Customs and Excise
William Hayden, Principal (Acting), War Grace
Thomas St. Quintin Hill, Principal Clerk, Food Section, Board of Trade
James Jackson  Superintendent, Salvage Department, Birmingham
Frederick James, Chief Constable of Hastings
William Hughes-Jones  Chairman of the Anglesey Employment Committee
Mary Elizabeth King, Member of the London Advisory Council for Juvenile Employment
James Kirkwood  Provost of Rutherglen. For public services.
John Corbet McBride  Accident Manager, Commercial Union Assurance Company. For public services.
Eric Machtig  Principal, Colonial Office
George Frederick Mansbridge, Vice-Controller, Stores Department, General Post Office
Arthur Killick Mayall, Chief Constable of Oldham
Captain Charles Leonard Miskin, Registrar, Imperial War Graves Commission
Henry Daniel Morgan, Chief Constable, 3 District, Metropolitan Police
William Jackson Morton  Group Commandant, L and M Divisions, Special Constabulary
William Suffield Felix Mylius, Assistant Secretary, Traffic Department, Metropolitan Police
William Newman  Superintendent, Metropolitan Police
Hedley Peters,  Chief Officer of the Sittingbourne Fire Brigade. For public services.
Zoe Lavallier Puxley, Principal, Ministry of Health
Florence Quick, Member of Oxford and District War Pensions Committee
Gilbert Scott Ram  Senior Electrical Inspector of Factories, Home Office
Percy Christopher Rice  Chief Establishment and Finance Officer, Department of Overseas Trade
Mary Ritchie  Voluntary Worker under the National Savings Committee
John Scott  Voluntary Worker under the National Savings Committee
James Applegate Simes, Principal, Ministry of Pensions
James Andrew Short, Collector, Board of Customs and Excise
Robert John Smith, Head of Branch (Acting), Ministry of Health
Ethel Mary Spiller. For voluntary services in connection with the Victoria and Albert Museum
Edith Felicia Seymour Taylor, Private Secretary to the Attorney General
Major Maurice Hilliard Tomlin, Chief Constable, Metropolitan Police
William Thomas Towler, Chairman of the Stratford Local Employment Committee
Edward White Wallis, Secretary of the Royal Sanitary Institute
Archibald Ure Wotherspoon, Chairman of the Perth and Kinross War Pensions Committee

British India
Sarclar Bahadur Sardar Haji Mahomed Khan, Sardar of the Shahwani tribe, Kalat State, Baluchistan
M. R. Ry. Diwan Bahadur Saravana Bhavanandam Pillai Avargal  ex-Sheriff of Madras
Sardar Saiyid Ali El Edrus, Sardar of Gujarat, Bombay
Arthur Clement Sells, Principal, Robertson College, Jubbulpore, Central Provinces
Anandrai Keshavlal Dalai  Professor of Clinical and Operative Surgery, Grant Medical College, Bombay, and Surgeon, Jamsetjee Jeejeebhoy Hospital, Bombay
Babu Bisheshwar Nam Srivastava, Vakil, High Court, and Chairman, Improvement Trust, Luck now
Captain Archibald Douglas George Staunton Batty  Army in India Reserve of Officers, lately Aide-de-Camp to His Excellency the Governor of Burma
Captain Ralph Burton, lately Aide-de-Camp to His Excellency the Viceroy
Babu Alakh Kumar Sinha, Superintendent of Police, Bihar and Orissa
Cecil William Kirkpatrick  Assistant Secretary to the Government of India, Foreign and Political Department
Jessie Parsons, Principal of the Badshah Nawab Razvi Training College for Women Teachers, Patna
The Reverend Robert McCheyne Paterson, Church of Scotland Mission, Gujrat, Punjab
Lucy Angela White, lately Lady Superintendent, Queen Alexandra's Military Nursing Service for India

Diplomatic Service and Overseas List
Minas Stephen Peter Aganoor, His Majesty's Vice-Consul at Ispahan
Alexander Mann Alcock, Deputy Director-General of the Tanzim Department, Ministry of Public Works, Egyptian Government
Colonel Julius Guthlac Birch, Rhineland High Commission
John Wallace Ord Davidson, Acting British Consul at Kiu Kiang
William Gray  His Majesty's Consul at Oruro
The Reverend John Holman Taylor Holman  Acting Chaplain at His Majesty's Legation at Peking
Harmood Victor Carruthers Johnstone, Resident Engineer, Gezira Canalisation
Reginald Marquand, Controller of European Administration of the Ministry of Education, Egyptian Government

Dominions
Edith Mary Cumings, for many years-Honorary Secretary of the Bulawayo Branch Of the Guild of Loyal Women; for her services in Southern Rhodesia
Mary Hewison, of St. Kilda, City of Melbourne; in recognition of her public and charitable services in the State of Victoria
Rebecca Mills, of Maffra, Gippsland; in recognition of her charitable services in the State of Victoria

Colonies, Protectorates, etc.

Robert Boyd, Chairman, Native Lands Commission, Fiji
Herbert Spanton Brain, Auditor, Palestine
The Reverend Canon George Burns, of the Church Missionary Society, in recognition of his services for many years in Kenya Colony
Hubert Michael Cones, Deputy Inspector-General of Police, Iraq
The Reverend Alexander Cruickshank, of the United Free Church of Scotland; in recognition of his services to education in Nigeria
The Reverend Canon Edward Seabrooke Daniell, Principal of the Bishop Tucker Memorial College, Uganda Protectorate
Lionel Douglas Galton Fenzi, Honorary Secretary of the Royal East African Automobile Association, Kenya Colony
Albert Arthur Magnall Isherwood, Deputy Director of Education, Tanganyika Territory
Robert Frier Jardine, Administrative Inspector, Ministry of the Interior, Iraq
Alan Logan Kirkbride, Second Assistant to the Chief British Representative, Trans-Jordan
Stephen Hemsley Longrigg, Administrative Inspector, Ministry of the Interior, Iraq
Digby Mackenzie Macphail  Medical Officer, District, St. Lucia, Windward Islands
William Maclachlan McDonald  Medical Officer, District 2, Antigua, Leeward Islands
John Dewar McKay, Senior Unofficial Member of the Legislative Council of the Gold Coast
Norman Nairn, for services in connection with the organisation of the Trans-Desert Motor Route between Iraq and the Mediterranean
Percy Wilbraliam Perryman  Deputy Chief Secretary, Uganda Protectorate
Major Norman Arthur Ralph Songest, lately Quartermaster, British Section, Palestine Gendarmerie
John Edwin Tessensohn, Member of the Legislative Council, Straits Settlements
Donald Francis Watson, Treasurer, Seychelles
Cecil Richard Webb  General Manager, Government Railways, Sierra Leone
Herbert Richmond Wells, of the London Missionary Society, in recognition of his services in the cause of Education in Hong Kong
Frank Edred Whitehead  Director of Medical and Sanitary Services, Nyasaland Protectorate

Honorary Officers
Surma Khaneem d'Bailt Mar Shimun, in recognition of her services in connection with the operations in Iraq, September–November, 1924
Moses Doukhan, Lands Officer, Department of Lands, Palestine
Suleiman Bey Toukan, Mayor of Nablus, Palestine

Member of the Order of the British Empire (MBE)

Military Division
Royal Navy
Lieutenant Herbert John Harvey (Retired)
Lieutenant George Lewin 
Commissioned Engineer Arthur Brown 
Commissioned Engineer William Murray Calder
Paymaster-Lieutenant Alfred Thomas May 
Captain John Charles James Hoby 

Army
Company Sergeant-Major Clarence FitzGeorge Andrews, Royal Corps of Signals, attached 51st Divisional Signals
Captain William Daniel Arthur, Royal Army Medical Corps
Captain Leslie Edwin Barnes, 4th Battalion, the Northamptonshire Regiment, Territorial Army
Staff Sergeant-Major Arthur Wellesley Baxter, Royal Army Service Corps, attached Sudan Defence Force
Lieutenant Thomas William Bell, 3rd/6th Dragoon Guards, Station Staff Officer, Rawalpindi
Quartermaster and Captain George Thomas Bray, Royal Army Medical Corps
Captain Noel Joseph Chamberlain, Army Educational Corps
Company Sergeant-Major James Chambers, Tyne Electrical Engineers, Royal Engineers, Territorial Army
Conductor Henry Joseph Cheetham, Indian Army Ordnance Corps
Captain William Maurice Clapp, 1/19th Hyderabad Regiment, Indian Army, attached Indian Signal Corps
Quartermaster and Captain Thomas Cook, Depot, the Buffs (East Kent Regiment)
Staff Sergeant-Major William Douglas, Royal Army Service-Corps
Superintending Clerk John Edington, Royal Engineers
Assistant Commissary and Lieutenant Andrew Forde, Indian Miscellaneous List
Captain Eric Herbert Cokayne Frith, The Somerset Light Infantry (Prince Albert's), Adjutant, 5th Battalion
Regimental Sergeant-Major Richard George Fry, Depot The Highland Light Infantry
Captain Albert Fulcher, Ordnance Executive Officer, Royal Army-Ordnance Corps
Temp. Lieutenant Herbert George Gates, Royal Engineers (Supplementary)
Captain Francis Marion Saunders Gibson, The Devonshire Regiment, Instructor Machine Gun School, India
Lieutenant Jack Ross Gifford  Royal Artillery, Staff Captain (Movements) Inter-Allied Railway Commission, The British Army of the Rhine
Staff Sergeant-Major Frederick Gill, Indian-Corps of Clerks
Quartermaster and Captain John Grieve, Royal Army Service Corps
Captain Frank Gowland Harvey  Army Educational Corps, Instructor Army School, of Education, Belgium
Regimental Sergeant Major Frank Hedges  2nd Battalion Royal Tank Corps
Quartermaster and Lieutenant George Henniker, Royal Engineers
Lieutenant Richard Henry Hooper, The King's Shropshire Light Infantry, Adjutant and Quartermaster Army Signal School, Poona
The-Reverend James Allen James  Royal Army Chaplains' Department
Quartermaster and Captain Frederick William Langley, The Sherwood Foresters (Nottinghamshire and Derbyshire Regiment)
Captain George James Leathern  The Bedfordshire and Hertfordshire Regiment, Adjutant, 2nd Battalion
Lieutenant Walter Thomas Lunt, Army Educational Corps, Instructor Army School of Education, Belgaum
Captain James Mahoney, Royal Tank Corps, Adjutant and Quartermaster, Royal Tank Corps School, Ahmednagar
Sergeant-Major Albert Edward Malley, Royal Army Medical Corps
Captain Richard Loudon McCreery  12th Royal Lancers (Prince of Wales's)
Captain Archibald Edward McDonald, Ordnance Executive Officer 3rd Class, Royal Army Ordnance Corps
Captain Walter Henry Organ, 43rd (Wessex) Divisional Engineers, Royal Engineers, Territorial Army
Regimental Sergeant-Major Charles Thomas Pearson, Royal Military College, Sandhurst
Lieutenant George Hamilton Charles Penny-cook, The Middlesex Regiment (The Duke of Cambridge's Own)
Staff Sergeant-Major Frederick Walter Price, Royal Army Service Corps
Captain Edward Cecil Roscoe  Royal Army Service Corps
Captain Eric Bertram Rowcroft  Royal Army Service Corps, Instructor Royal Army Service Corps Training College, Aldershot
Quartermaster Sergeant Frederick Albert Smith, 167th (City of London) Field Ambulance, Territorial Army
Regimental Sergeant-Major Arthur Patrick Spackman, Royal Army Medical Corps, attached Sudan Defence Force
Lieutenant William George Tibbies  5th Battalion, The Gloucestershire Regiment, Territorial Army
Conductor Frederick William Tolley, Indian Miscellaneous List
Quartermaster and Captain George John William Townsend, 17th London Regiment (Poplar and Stepney Rifles), Territorial Army
Captain Bernard Henry George Tucker, 1/10th Gurkha Rifles, Indian Army
Regimental Quartermaster-Sergeant Alexander Turner, The King's Own Yorkshire Light Infantry
Regimental Sergeant-Major Alexander Twohey, Depot, The East Surrey Regiment
Captain Vereker Willoughby Hamilton Venour, The King's Regiment (Liverpool), Staff Captain (Movements) Inter-Allied Railway Commission, The British Army of the Rhine
Regimental Sergeant-Major Edward George Walker, Iraq Levies
Quartermaster and Captain George Henry Wall  3rd Battalion, Grenadier Guards
Quartermaster and Captain Alexander Watt, Lieutenant, Regular Army Reserve of Officers, and 7th Battalion, The Argyll and Sutherland Highlanders (Princess Louise's) Territorial Army
Conductor Tom Harris Webb, Indian Army Service Corps
Quartermaster and Captain Samuel Whan, County Recruiting Officer, Durham

Royal Air Force
Flying Officer John Henry Amers 
Flying Officer Charles Dollery
Flying Officer Robert Ritchie Greenlaw
Flying Officer William Henry Jinman

Civil Division

James Anderson, Accountant, General Post Office, Edinburgh
James William Anderson, Superintendent, Metropolitan Police
Joseph William Ansell, Ex-Superintendent, London Fire Brigade
Elizabeth Apps, Member of the Baling, Acton and District War Pensions Committee
Ernest Bacchus, Superintendent, B Division, Metropolitan Police
Harold Eustace Baker, Commandant, Special Constabulary
John Joseph Septimus Barker, Clerk to-the Lanchester Board of Guardians
John Patrick Barrett, Clerk, Office of Assistant Director of Military Transport, Royal Arsenal, Woolwich
William Henry Boucher, Acting First-Class Clerk, Ministry of Health
William Stanley Brown, Assessor and Collector of Income Tax
Joseph Browne, a founder of the United Kingdom Pilots Association
James Kennedy Bryson, Surveyor, Board of Customs and Excise
William Henry Bushill, Assistant Accountant, War Office
Hugh James Campbell, Higher Executive Officer, Ministry of Home Affairs, Northern Ireland
Olive Campbell, of Inverneill  Member of the Argyll, Renfrew and Bute War Pensions Committee
Annie Bindon Geoffrey Carter, Founder of Painted Fabrics Disabled Soldiers and Sailors Mutual Association
Ethel Catherine Mary Gates, Higher Clerical Officer, Ministry of Health
Albert Henry Coates, Clerk of Accounts, H.M. Land Registry
Arthur Richard Cotton, Clerk to the Epsom Rural District Council
Bertie Gibson Crewe, Principal Staff Officer, Industrial Property Department, Board of Trade
Elizabeth Winifred Cronin, Deputy Governor, Hollow ay Prison
Thomas James Dale, Accountant
Finance Department, Ministry of Labour
Gwendolen Florence Davies, Member of the Prime Minister's Clerical Staff
William Michael Reuben Davis, Superintendent, Odiham Division, Aldershot, Hampshire County Police
Alfred Ernest Dean, Honorary Secretary, Swindon Savings Committee
James Elphinstone For voluntary services to the Scottish Savings Committee
Alfred Vincent Elsden  Deputy War Department Chemist
Thomas William Faulkner, Superintendent, Metropolitan Police
John Laird Fitzhenry, Higher Executive Officer, Ministry of Finance, Northern Ireland
Arthur Folkarde For voluntary services to the Scottish Savings Committee
Joseph Gould, Surveyor, Board of, Customs and Excise
Arthur Powell Guest  Honorary Secretary, Taunton Savings Committee
John Milbanke Hamilton, Manager, Tavistock Street (Building Trades) Employment Exchange
Louisa Mildred Bateson Peter Hammond, Honorary Secretary, Leyburn Savings Committee, Yorkshire
Hobert William Hatswell, Senior Staff Officer, Secretary's Office, General Post Office
James Patrick Hausey, Waterguard Superintendent, Board of Customs and Excise
Alfred Hayden, Commander, P Division, Special Constabulary
Horace William Woodress Henderson, Civil Engineer, Acting Superintending Civil Engineer, Iraq Air Ministry
John Holcroft, Surveyor, Board of Customs and Excise
Ernest Harry Holmwood, Honorary Secretary, Maidstone Savings Committee
John Frederick Houghton, Honorary Secretary, Gateshead Savings Committee
Henry Humphrey, Honorary Secretary, Bolton Savings Committee
Major Reginald Edmund Hutchins, Area Superintendent, France, and Registration Officer, France, under the Imperial War Graves Commission
James Rae Anderson Irving, Superintendent, Gosforth Division, Northumberland Police
Captain James Andrew Johnston, District Commandant, Ulster Special Constabulary
John David Jones  Member of the North West Wales War Pensions Committee
David Kerr, Higher Executive Officer, Ministry of Commerce, Northern Ireland
Frances King, Honorary Secretary, Dawlish Savings Committee
James Arthur Trotman Langton, Higher Clerical Officer, Ministry of Health
Arthur Arnold Lewis, Superintendent, Manchester City Police
Arthur Claud Linecar, Headmaster, LCC Acland Central School
James Mark, Deputy City Commandant, Ulster Special Constabulary
Beatrice Mellors, Staff Clerk, Employment and Insurance Department, Ministry of Labour
John Menzies, Collector of Taxes, Glasgow
Thomas Mitchell  Chairman, Stoke-on-Trent Savings Committee
Maude Victoria Moore, Higher Executive Officer, Foreign Office
Walter Henry Norman, Higher Executive Officer, Ministry of Pensions
Daniel Joseph O'Callaghan, Accountant; Department of Overseas Trade
Edgar Nix Pentelow, Surveyor, Board of Customs and Excise
Doris Winifred Perken, Member of the Camberwell and District War Pensions Committee
Leonard Perkins, Headmaster of Newton Road Council School, Rushden
Sydney Richard Pughe, Staff Officer, Colonial Office
Leslie Newby Punter  Tax Officer, Higher Grade, Board of Inland Revenue
Edward Albert Rix, Registrar, Commissioner's Office, Metropolitan Police
Lewis Findlay Robertson, CA For voluntary services to the Scottish Savings Committee
Edward William Roe, Commandant, T Division, Special Constabulary
Hugh Alexander Ross, Commander E Division, Special Constabulary
Gertrude Sanson, Headmistress, The Moberley Infants School, Harrow Road
Amy Sayle, Chairman of Women Sanitary Inspectors' and Health Visitors' Association
Alfred Younger Smellie, Staff Clerk and Accounts Officer, Air Ministry
Margaret Stafford Smith  Honorary Secretary, Bromley Savings Committee
Charles Alonzo Stone, Superintendent
Chesterfield Division, Derbyshire Police
Stanley Cecil Strong, Supervising Clerk, War Office
Alfred Egerton Maynard Taylor, Commander, "A" Division, Special Constabulary
Frederick Tyler, Assistant Commander, Special Constabulary (H.Q. Staff)
John Holland Walker, Honorary Secretary, Nottingham Savings Committee
Walter John Walker  Chief Auditor, Bankruptcy Department, Board of Trade
Joseph Adams White, Headmaster, LCC School, Bow
Captain David Evan Williams  Education Officer, Air Ministry
William Winter, Deputy Chief Constable and Superintendent (Newmarket Division), Cambridgeshire Police

British India
Alexander George Butt, Supervisor, Officer of the Director, Medical Services in India
Shamrao Venkatrao Haldipur, Office of the Judge Advocate-General in India
Arthur George Hall, Assistant Executive Engineer, Khyber Railway
Major Joseph Henry Arnold Donnelland, Indian Medical Department, House Surgeon, Jamsetjee Jeejeebhoy Hospital, Bombay
Major Henry Clement Craggs, Indian Medical Department, Military Assistant Surgeon, Madras
Lieutenant Nawab Jamshed Ali Khan, Member of Legislative Council, United Provinces
Khan Bahadur Ghias-ul-din Saiyid Abdul Karim Sahib Bahadur, Acting Deputy Superintendent of Police, Madras
Thomas Bertram, Superintendent, Viceregal Estates
Captain Albert Ignatius Patrick Browne, Postmaster, Peshawar
Patrick Ambrose McCormack, District Engineer and Secretary, Quetta Municipality
Alexander William Halkett, Indo-European Telegraph Department Office, Duzdap, East Persia
George Herbert Cave, late Curator, Lloyd Botanic Garden, Darjeeling
John Creffield, Inspector in charge of Government House, Calcutta
Alakli Beliari Arora, Medical Officer of Health, Lahore
Rao Bahadur Kesho Waman Brahma, Pleader, Amraoti, Berar
George Winstanley Price, Deputy Superintendent of Police, Punjab
William Golaknath, Secretary Municipal Committee and District Board, Jullundur, Punjab
Gerald Potenger, Superintendent, Office of the Military Adviser-in-Chief, Indian State Forces, Punjab
Agnes Smith, Sambha Nath Pandit Hospital, Calcutta

Diplomatic Service and Overseas List
Leonard Bennett Bayley, Divisional Traffic Superintendent, Sudan Government Railways
John Preston Beecher, His Majesty's Vice-Consul at Havre
Mulla Muhammad Aln Sharaf AH Harravala, His Majesty's Legation, Addis Ababa
Robert Knight Hartley, Rhineland High Commission
Philip Ingleson  Assistant District Commissioner, Sudan Government
Robert Carl Thorburn Jobson, His Majesty's Ex Vice-Consul at Warberg
Georgina Loinaz, British Library of Information, New York
William Studart, His Majesty's Vice-Consul at Ceara
Edmund David Watt, His Majesty's Vice-Consul at Port-au-Prince
William Calderwood Young  Inspector of Agriculture, Sudan Government

Colonies, Protectorates, etc.
Alfreda Louisa Allen, Principal of the Gayaza School for Girls, Uganda Protectorate
Katherine Ross Cameron, Matron of the Zomba Hospital, Nyasaland Protectorate
The Reverend James Denton  Principal of the Pourah Bay College, Freetown, Sierra Leone
Major Joseph Turner Dew  formerly Officer Commanding the Defence Force, Antigua, Leeward Islands
Charles Peter Dias, Headmaster of Wesley College and Member of the Municipal Council of Colombo, Ceylon
Henry David Grant  lately Head-Constable-Major, Palestine Gendarmerie
The Reverend William Edward Horley, Headmaster of the Anglo-Chinese School, Ipoh, Perak, Federated Malay States
The Reverend Mother Superior Joseph, of the Catholic Mission of the Congregation of St. Joseph of Cluny; in recognition of her long services in the Gambia.
Alexander Menzies Macfarlane  Government Veterinary Surgeon, Malta
Kenneth Mackenzie, late Superintendent of Stores and Government Bookshop, Ministry of Education, Iraq
Donald Kirton Macwilliam, Revenue Officer and Harbour Master, St. Kitts, Leeward Islands
Jane McCotter, Senior Nursing Sister, Nigeria
Elizabeth McKey, Senior Nursing Sister, Civil Nursing Service, Iraq
The Reverend Father John Meehan, of the Catholic Mission of the Holy Ghost Fathers; in recognition of his services in the Gambia
The Reverend Father Joseph Georges Edouard Michaud, Principal of the Kisube Boys School, Uganda Protectorate
Ahmode Hajee Ahlanian Suhawon, in recognition of his services to Education in the Savanne District, Mauritius
Foonyee Catherine Woo, Headmistress of St. Paul's Girls School, Hong Kong

Honorary Members
Abdin Effendi Husheimi, Assistant Superintendent Of Police, Palestine
Abdullah Effendi Kardus, Administrative Officer, Palestine
Ahmed Seif Ed Bin Effendi Husseini, Mayor of Lydda, Palestine
Asher Ben-David, Instructional Officer, Police Training School, Palestine
Halim Abu Rahmeh, Medical Officer, Department of Health, Palestine
Rank Bey Beydun, Administrative Officer, Palestine
Sheikh Suleiman bin Nasur el-Lemki, Unofficial Member of the Legislative Council, Zanzibar, in recognition of his public and charitable services.

Members of the Order of the Companions of Honour (CH) 

The Reverend Herbert Armitage James  President of St. John's College, Oxford

Kaisar-i-Hind Medal
First Class
Mary Langharne Symons, Madras
Florence Amy Hodgson, Chief Lady-Superintendent, Lady Minto's Indian Nursing Association
Agnes Scott  Chief Medical Officer, Women's Medical Service, and Secretary, Countess of Dufferin's Fund
John David O'Donnell  Chief Medical and Sanitary Officer, Kolar Gold Fields, Mysore
The Reverend Charles Walker Posnett, Chairman and General Superintendent of the Wesleyan Mission in His Exalted Highness the Nizams Dominions, Medak, Hyderabad (Deccan)
Major Joseph Alexander Hercules Holmes, Indian Medical Department, Senior Assistant Surgeon, British Station Hospital, Quetta
Rose Greenfield, Murree, Punjab
The Reverend Edward Sherman Oakley, London Mission, Almora, United Provinces
The Reverend James Alexander Drysdale, Minister, Scots Church, Rangoon

British Empire Medal (BEM)

For Gallantry
Staff Sergeant Reginald Harry Maltby, 11th Armoured Car Company, Lahore, in recognition of the heroism he displayed in saving a child from drowning in a disused well.

For Meritorious Service
Corporal William Watson Denton  British Section of the Palestine Gendarmie. For consistently good work during his service.
William James Ferguson, Constable, Royal Ulster Constabulary. For long and meritorious service of an exceptionally high standard.
Staff Sergeant Harold Player, British Section of the Palestine Gendarmie. For loyal and devoted service as Orderly Room Staff Sergeant and Chief Clerk.

Air Force Cross (AFC)

Flight Lieutenant John Stanley Chick 
Flight Lieutenant Archibald James Rankin

Air Force Medal (AFM)
Sergeant Frederick Gilders Hammond
Leading Aircraftman Ernest Arthur Dobbs

Imperial Service Order (ISO)
Home Civil Service
Owen Vincent Blake  Chief Accountant, Foreign Office
Ernest George Haygarth Brown, Superintending Inspector, Ministry of Agriculture and Fisheries
James Latham Brown, Assistant Inspector of Elementary Schools, Board of Education
Frank Richardson Chappell  Chief Examining Surveyor, H.M. Office of Works
Charles Alexander Comber, Chief Inspector, Postal Traffic, General Post Office
John Cuthbert, Chief Clerk, Accountant-General's Department, Supreme Court of Judicature, Northern Ireland
Matthew John Drayson, Staff Officer, Assistant Accountant, Colonial Office
Frank Finch, Assistant Registrar-General, General Register Office
Charles Henry James Garland, Divisional Inspector, Outdoor Staff, Ministry of Health
Colvin Blacklock Gibson, Chief Assistant Keeper, Sasines Office, Edinburgh
Horace John Macartney, Principal Staff Officer, Scottish Education Department
Charles Richard Malcolm, Assistant Inspector of Explosives, Home Office
Arthur Darling Nicholson, Divisional Inspector of Mines, Mines Department
Henry Charles Souter, Head of Returns and Statistics Branch, Friendly Societies Registry
Arthur Robinson Wright, Assistant Comptroller, Patent Office

Dominions
Herbert William Ely, Secretary to the Agent-General in London for the State of Tasmania
Robert Edward Hayes, Secretary to the Treasury, Dominion of New Zealand
Francis Joseph Ross, President of the Superannuation Fund Management Board, Commonwealth of Australia
Charles Henry Wickens, Statistician, Commonwealth of Australia

Colonial Civil Service
Benjamin Belleth, Office Assistant to the Colonial Secretary, Ceylon
Edward D'Urban Blyth, Assistant Commissioner, Basutoland
Edgar Bonavia  Permanent Secretary to the Head of the Ministry, Malta
Donald d'Emmerez de Charmoy, Assistant Director and Entomologist, Agricultural Department, Mauritius
Henry James Hobbs, Provincial Commissioner, Gold Coast
Henry Peter Marius McLaughlan  Chief Clerk in the Colonial Secretary's Office and Clerk to the Executive Council, Cyprus
Dato Khatib Haji Mohamed Said, the Dato Sri Diraja, of Kelantan, Judge of the Land Court at Kota Bharu, Malay States

Indian Civil Service
James Rideout Belletty, Registrar, Political and Appointment Departments, Government of Bengal
Major Herbert William Valentine Cox, Indian Medical Department, Civil Surgeon, Punjab
Ernest Henry James Eames, Distillery Expert to Government, Central Provinces
Martin Thomas Echlin, Personal Assistant to the Chief Commissioner, Andaman and Nicobar Islands
Thomas Edward McCullagh, Telegraph Check Office, Calcutta
Khan Bahadur Kavasji Jamshedji Petigara, Superintendent of Police, Bombay

Imperial Service Medal (ISM)

Venkatachellum Ramasawamy Mudaliyar, Tent Foreman, Central Jail, Coimbatore, Madras

References

Birthday Honours
1926 awards
1926 in Australia
1926 in India
1926 in the United Kingdom